The City of Sacramento, which serves as the state capital of California, was founded in December 1848 by John Sutter. The following year, California's Gold Rush brought an influx of "forty-niners" and, shortly thereafter, goods, services, and industry to meet the needs of the booming population. Throughout the late 19th and early 20th century, Sacramento's commercial, industrial, government, and residential uses flourished, creating a vibrant urban downtown.

By the middle of the 20th century, however, much of the historic downtown had degraded into slums and residents began moving further east into the growing suburbs burgeoning along the American River. The city core continued to support a vast public sector; however, modern architectural styles brought bleak office monoliths that lacked versatility. Without significant entertainment, Sacramento developed into an eight-to-five government town.

Interest in urban redevelopment and historic preservation grew in the 1970s and began to take shape in the 1980s with the publicly financed renewal of Old Sacramento and the private development of several office buildings along the Capital Mall. After a slight lull in development due to the recession of the early 1990s, Mayor Heather Fargo made the downtown a pillar of her program in 2001. Since then, the increase in population, traffic, and housing values has increased interest in downtown living among metropolitan residents, making high-rise condominium living financially viable. A multitude of private and government developments have emerged in the capital city over the past two years.

External links
 SkyscraperPage's Sacramento Discussion Forum (contains fairly reliable information and context)
 Emporis' information about Sacramento high-rises
 CADA (Capital Area Development Authority) website
 City of Sacramento's Design Review and Preservation Board
 City of Sacramento's Economic Development Department

Sacramento, California
Redevelopment projects in the United States
Urban planning in California
Geography of Sacramento, California
History of Sacramento, California